Julie Kirwan is a camogie player, winner of an All-Star award in 2005 and an All Ireland medal in 2004. She was nominated for further All Star awards in 2004, and on the Tipperary team defeated in the All Ireland finals of 2005 and 2006.

References

Living people
Tipperary camogie players
Year of birth missing (living people)